Oberá Airport is a public use airport serving Oberá, a city in the Misiones Province of Argentina. The airport is at the south edge of the city.

See also

Transport in Argentina
List of airports in Argentina

References

External links 
OpenStreetMap - Oberá Airport
FallingRain - Obera Airport

Airports in Argentina
Buildings and structures in Misiones Province
Oberá